Gian Rinaldo Carli (1720–1795), also known by other names, was an Italian economist, historian, and antiquarian.

Name
"Gian Rinaldo Carli" is the modern Italian form of his name, which may also appear as "Gianrinaldo Carli" or "Gian-Rinaldo Carli". His  was credited to "Conte Don Gianrinaldo Carli-Rubbi". In this name,  is the Italian form of "count",  is an honorific derived from the Latin  ("lord, master"), "Gian" is the most common Italian diminutive for Giovanni, and his surname has been hyphenated with his wife's. His  was credited to "Commendatore Conte Don Gianrinaldo Carli", where  is the Italian form of "commander", from his knightly honors. He signed his name in Latin as "". In early English sources, his name also appears as "Giovanni Rinaldo, Count of Carli", and "Giovanni Rinaldo, Count of Carli-Rubbi".

Life

Giovanni Rinaldo Carli was born at Capo d'Istria in the Republic of Venice (now Koper in Slovenia) on April 11, 1720, the eldest child of Count Rinaldo Carli and Cecilia Imberti.

He distinguished himself as a student and young scholar. In 1744, at the age of 24, he was appointed by the Venetian Senate to the University of Padua's newly established professorship of astronomy and navigation. At the same time, he was entrusted with superintendence over the Venetian marine. During these years he was part of a major dispute in Italian academia over the existence of sorcerers, with the vast majority of the academics siding with the Girolamo Tartarotti against the Marquis of Maffei and Count Carli's sharp scepticism. He filled his offices ably for seven years before resigning them to study economics and history. He works on economics attracted the attention of Leopold of Tuscany, afterwards emperor, who placed him at the head of his economics council and board of public instruction in 1765. In 1769, he became privy councillor and, in 1771, president of a new council of finances. In his old age, he was relieved of the duties of these offices while continuing to receive their income. During his leisure, he produced works on Italian history and other topics.

Count Carli died of illness at Cusano in Milan on February 22, 1795.

Works

His principal economic works are his On Money; his 1759 Ragionamento..., in which he argued that the balance of trade between two nations cannot be looked at in isolation as both may gain from their reciprocal transactions; and his 1771 On Free Trade in Grain, which argues that free trade in grain—as adopted by Great Britain following its later repeal of its Corn Laws—is not always advisable. His principal historical work was his Italian Antiquities, in which the literature and arts of his country are ably discussed. Other works of note were his The Free Man, a rebuttal of Rousseau's Social Contract; an attack upon Abbe Tartarotti's assertion of the existence of magicians; his Observations on Ancient and Modern Music; and several poems. A collected edition of his works was published in 18 volumes at Milan from 1784 to '94; it does not include his American Letters.

 . 

 
 . 
 

	

 
 . & 
 , which forms Part II of the Delle Antichità Italiche. & 
 & 
 & 
 , sometimes called Vol. V of the Delle Antichità Italiche. &

References

Sources
 .
 
 
 . 
 .

External links 
 Gian Rinaldo Carli High School in Koper
 Vols. I & II of a French translation of his American Letters
 A Spanish translation of his American Letters

1720 births
1795 deaths
Italian archaeologists
Italian economists
Republic of Venice politicians
Writers from Koper
Academic staff of the University of Padua
18th-century Venetian people